"All 4 One" is the second single taken from beFour's second album All 4 One. It was released as a double A-side single with How Do You Do? in Germany, Austria and Switzerland. The song reached the top 5 in Austria and only narrowly missed the top ten in Germany and Switzerland.

Formats and track listings
These are the formats and track listings of the single releases of "All 4 One":

Maxi CD single
How Do You Do? - 3:09
All 4 One - 3:40
All 4 One (Karaoke Version) - 3:40
Video - 3:40

Digital Download
How Do You Do? - 3:09
All 4 One - 3:40
All 4 One (Karaoke Version) - 3:40

Charts

BeFour songs
2007 singles
2007 songs
Universal Records singles
Songs written by Christian Geller
Song recordings produced by Christian Geller